is a Japanese actor. Matsuda began acting in high school when a girl he had a crush on convinced him to join the theatre club. He later joined the sho-gekijo theatrical troupe Haiyu-Za. Nowadays known for roles such as Kagero in the low-budget films Shinobi: The Law of Shinobi, 2002, and its sequels Shinobi: Runaway, 2005 (not related to the 2005 film Shinobi: Heart Under Blade), Shinobi: Hidden Techniques, and Shinobi: A Way Out. He is probably best known in Japan for numerous roles he has played in the tokusatsu genre: starting with Kamen Rider Hibiki as Zaoumaru Zaitsuhara/Kamen Rider Zanki (as well as related characters: Buddhist monk Kamen Rider Touki in the movie special - a Sengoku-era version of Zanki - and an alternate Zanki from the Hibiki World as depicted in Kamen Rider Decade), and in Kamen Rider Kiva as Jiro/Garulu (who made a cameo appearance in Cho Kamen Rider Den-O & Decade Neo Generations: The Onigashima Warship). He has also appeared in a cameo in the Kamen Rider G special and has a recurring role in the series Garo: Makai Senki. He played the role of Raizo Gabi in Shuriken Sentai Ninninger.

He is most internationally known, however, for his role as the butterfly knife-wielding gangster in Ryuhei Kitamura's pop culture hit film, Versus. He has also lent his voice to the Wii video game Dragon Quest Swords as the hero's father, Baud. He also play the role of Zebra from the series Toriko''.

External links
Official blog 

1971 births
Living people
Kamen Rider
People from Ibaraki, Osaka
Japanese male actors